NGC 344 is a barred spiral galaxy in the constellation Cetus. It was discovered in 1886 by Frank Muller. It was described by John Louis Emil Dreyer as "extremely faint, very small, irregularly round, suddenly brighter middle and nucleus (perhaps a star?)."

References

0344
?
Cetus (constellation)
Spiral galaxies
198261